The TERA rifles were special Japanese takedown rifles developed for paratroopers of the Imperial Japanese Army. All designs were capable of either being broken down or folded into two parts and easily assembled or disassembled.

Variants
 Type 100: Based on the Karabiner 98k Fallschirmjäger detachable-barrel (Abnehmbarer Lauf) variant. Complete copy prototype; never mass-produced.
 Type 1: Based on the Type 38 cavalry rifle. Replicating the mechanism of the Karabiner 98k Klappschaft Variant, it was not separated but folded. The Type 1 was not introduced because its folding mechanism was not reliable enough.
 Type 2: Based on the Type 99 rifle. Common production variant. Separated into two parts: stock and action, and barrel and sights.

References

Bolt-action rifles of Japan
World War II infantry weapons of Japan
Imperial Japanese Army